Hondos Center is a beauty retail market that has been operational in Greece since 1967. With 79 stores around Greece and employing over 6,000 people is enlisted amongst the prime and largest known cosmetics distribution networks in Europe.

References

External links
athensconventionbureau
inyourpocket
virtualtourist.com

Retail markets in Greece
Retail companies of Greece
Cosmetics companies of Greece
Greek brands
Retail companies established in 1967